INVU is the third studio album by South Korean singer Taeyeon. The album was released by SM Entertainment on February 14, 2022, and contains thirteen tracks, including the 2021 standalone single "Weekend", the pre-release single "Can't Control Myself", and the lead single of the same name, the former duo charted at top 10 and the latter debuted atop the Gaon Digital Chart.

Background and release
On January 11, 2022, SM Entertainment announced that Taeyeon would pre-release a digital single titled "Can't Control Myself" on January 17 prior to the release of her third studio album in February 2022. On January 26, the name of the third studio album was announced as INVU and would be released on February 14 and consists of thirteen tracks, with pre-orders starting on the same day. Three days later, the promotional schedule was released. On February 3, the mood sampler video was released with "INVU" announced as the lead single. On February 4, it was announced that an exhibition titled "INVU: THE EXHIBIT" would be held in Seoul from February 7–14 to commemorate the release of the album where attendees "can appreciate the concept of the album". On the same day, SM announced that the highlight video teaser scheduled for release from February 4–10 has been cancelled due to production issues. On February 8, the track listing was released. On February 13, the music video teaser for "INVU" was released.

Composition
INVU consists of thirteen tracks and incorporates various genres of ballad, dance, and pop. The lead single "INVU" was described as a house and pop dance song that has "soft and dreamy synth sound", "impressive flute melody in the chorus", "vocals that deeply express the various emotions contained in the song", and "splendid high notes [that] emphasize the lyrics [of the song]". The second track "Some Nights" was described as a R&B ballad song with "dreamy vocals harmonized by gentle guitar and piano performances", including samples of the Edvard Grieg's arrangement "Solveig's Song (Solvejgs sang)" from Peer Gynt, Op. 23. The third track "Can't Control Myself" was described as a rock, garage rock, and pop punk ballad love song that "stimulates emotions with intense sound" with lyrics about "the dangerous love that has lost control" and "[the person] still longs for the other person's heart despite the intuition that they will be hurt". The fourth track "Set Myself On Fire" was described as a pop song characterized by "vintage guitar performance that stimulates emotions" with lyrics about "the denial of reality after seeing couples saying farewell to each other" from Taeyeon's POV.

The fifth track "Toddler" was described as a pop dance song with "exciting bass performance that flow in harmony with the disco rhythm". The sixth track "Siren" was described as a medium-tempo pop ballad song with "attractive sense of speed for the chorus an dreamy synth sound" with lyrics about "luring the person in love to the ruin" and based on the "motif of Siren in Greek and Roman mythology". The seventh track "Cold As Hell" was described as an up-tempo pop song with "a bright and cheerful rhythm" and "catchy chorus that is repeated like a spell" with lyrics about "the heartbreaking and regretful loss of a person, who gave up everything for love". The eighth track "Timeless" was described as a "nostalgia" synth-pop dance song with "retro vibe and rhythm".

The ninth track "Heart" was described a pop ballad song that "starts with a minimalist focus on the guitar before progressing to an intense distortion bass and piano". The tenth track "No Love Again" was described as a "up-tempo" pop song with an "upbeat guitar performance and drum sound that provides a danceable atmosphere" with lyrics about "containing the feelings of not wanting to fall in love anymore due to ending up getting hurt anytime despite the anticipation of starting a relationship". The eleventh track "You Better Not" was described as a song that changes between "the eerie feeling of organ, violin, and vocal harmony" and the "strong 808 bass break" with lyrics containing a "message [about] a person who remains a desolate space as [they] cannot accept the parting". The twelfth track "Weekend" was described as a disco and city pop song characterized by guitar and retro synth sounds with lyrics about "wanting to freely go on a trip during the weekend". The last track "Ending Credits" was described as a medium-tempo pop song that "heightens emotions with deep sense of impact" characterized by "powerful drum sound", "multiple layers of synthesizer", and "[Taeyeon's] emotional vocals".

Commercial performance
INVU debuted at number two on South Korea's Gaon Album Chart in the chart issue dated February 13–19, 2022; on the monthly chart, the album debuted number four in the chart issue for February 2022 with 129,783 copies sold. On the Billboard Japan Hot Albums, the album debuted at number 47 in the chart issue dated February 16, 2022, ascending to number 21 in the chart issue dated March 16, 2022. The album also debuted at number 38 on Japan's Oricon Albums Chart in the chart issue dated March 7, 2022, ascending to number 18 in the chart issue dated March 21, 2022. In United Kingdom, the album debuted at position 70 on the OCC's UK Digital Albums in the chart issue dated February 18–24, 2022. In United States, the album debuted at position 20 on the Billboard Heatseekers Albums in the chart issue dated February 26, 2022.

Critical reception

Time chose INVU as one of "The Best K-pop Albums of 2022 So Far", with contributor Kat Moon acclaiming that "Taeyeon takes the listener on an intimate journey through the complex emotions of being in love with INVU".

Rain Tears from Korean online magazine Idology found INVU as "an exemplary case of a full album that draws a long narrative, and it will become a milestone in Taeyeon's discography". While critics Squib spoke of it as "the merits of her first album My Voice, which transmits her voice through prisms of various genres, and her second album Purpose, which meticulously depicts the devastating monodrama throughout the album". Meanwhile, critics Mano praised her impressive vocal and described the album as "tenacity, even hysterical, or highly sensitive (all in a good sense)"

Jung Soo-min of IZM called INVU "a rich and elegant moonlight" in which "contains emotional changes and personal maturity under an organic and dense design from the beginning to the end". While Tanu I. Raj of NME complimented Taeyeon's approach to the topic "love" and her experience of love, "with a consuming self-awareness about her goals, ambitions and shortcomings" in which "to every emotion related, she imparts a mysticism that immediately arrests". He concluded that the album is "the story on this particular one might have been heartbreaking and soul-crushing, but there certainly will be another chapter – hopefully, a brighter, more loving one. Till then, we’ll all nurse our bitter hearts and envy the ones who have it all".

In the 2022 year-end listicles, INVU was named as the one of the best K-pop Album of the Year by IZM, and Nylon. Time named INVU as one of the five best Korean Albums of the Year. NME named it as the seventh best Asian Albums of the Year.

Promotion
Prior to the album's release, on February 14, 2022, Taeyeon held a live event called "Taeyeon INVU Countdown Live" on YouTube to introduce the album and communicate with her fans.

Track listing

Credits and personnel
Credits adapted from album's liner notes.

Studio
 SM Big Shot Studio – recording , mixing 
 MonoTree Studio – recording 
 SM LVYIN Studio – recording , digital editing , engineered for mix , mixing 
 Doobdoob Studio – recording, digital editing 
 SM Starlight Studio – recording , digital editing , engineered for mix 
 SM SSAM Studio – recording , digital editing , engineered for mix 
 SM Yellow Tail Studio – recording , digital editing , engineered for mix 
 SM Blue Cup Studio – mixing 
 SM Blue Ocean Studio – mixing 
 SM Concert Hall Studio – mixing 
 SM 821 Sound Mastering - mastering 

Personnel

 SM Entertainment – executive producer
 Lee Soo-man – producer
 Yoo Young-jin – Music and sound director
 Taeyeon – vocals , background vocals , lyrics 
 Rachel Furner – background vocals, composition 
 Kwon Ae-jin – background vocals 
 Maja Keuc – background vocals 
 Alna Hofmeyr – background vocals, lyrics 
 Salem Ilese – background vocals, composition 
 Amanda Cygnaeus – background vocals, composition 
 Willemijn van der Neut – background vocals, composition 
 Jinli (Full8loom) – lyrics 
 Kim Eana – lyrics 
 Moon Seol-ri – lyrics 
 Kenzie – lyrics, vocal directing 
 Kang Eun-jung – lyrics 
 Aeon – lyrics 
 Mok Ji-min (lalala Studio) – lyrics 
 Cha Yu-bin – lyrics 
 Jo Yung-yeong – lyrics 
 Lee Yi-jin (153/Joombas) – lyrics 
 Hwang Yu-bin – lyrics 
 Ji Ye-won (153/Joombas) – lyrics 
 Peter Wallevik – composition 
 Daniel Davidsen – composition 
 Jess Morgan – composition 
 Edvard Grieg – composition 
 Simon Petrén – composition, arrangement 
 Andreas Öberg – composition 
 Celine Svanback – composition 
 Lauritz Emil Christiansen – composition, arrangement 
 Mich Hansen – composition , arrangement 
 Jacob Ubizz – composition, arrangement 
 Ryan Jhun – composition, arrangement 
 Michael Dunaief – composition 
 Ryland Holland – composition 
 Hamid Bashir – composition 
 William Leong – composition, arrangement 
 Mike Daley – composition, arrangement 
 Mitchell Owens – composition, arrangement 
 Rodnae 'Chikk' Bell – composition 
 Nicole 'Kole' Cohen – composition 
 Lara Andersson – composition 
 Manon van Dijk – composition  
 Marcus van Wattum – composition, arrangement 
 Alida Garpestad Peck – composition 
 Sean Fischer – composition, arrangement 
 Ben Samama – composition 
 Cameron Warren – composition, arrangement 
 Connie Talbot – composition 
 Alma Guðmundsdóttir – composition 
 Alida Garpestad Peck – composition 
 Marc Sibley – composition 
 Nathan Cunningham – composition 
 Hilda Stenmalm – composition 
 Jeppe London Bilsby – composition, arrangement 
 RoseInPeace – composition, arrangement 
 Saimon – composition, arrangement 
 Marcia "Misha" Sondeijker – composition 
 Sam Merrifield – composition 
 PhD – arrangement 
 Stryv – arrangement 
 Nova Blue – arrangement 
 Kasperi A. Pitkanen – arrangement 
 Space Primates – arrangement 
 Lee Min-kyu – recording , mixing 
 Kang Sun-young – recording 
 Lee Ji-hong – recording , digital editing , engineered for mix , mixing 
 Lee Ji-heung – recording 
 Jang Woo-young – recording , digital editing 
 Jeong Yu-ra – recording , digital editing , engineered for mix 
 Kang Eun-ji – recording , digital editing , engineered for mix 
 Noh Min-ji – recording , digital editing , engineered for mix 
 Lee Joo-hyung – vocal directing , Pro Tools 
 minGtion – vocal directing 
 G-high – vocal directing , Pro Tools 
 Lee Ji-hom – digital editing , engineered for mix 
 Jeong Eui-seok – mixing 
 Kim Cheol-soon – mixing 
 Nam Gung-jin – mixing 
 Lee Sang-hyun – drums, bass 
 Lee Seol-min – guitar, keyboard 
 Kwon Nam-woo - mastering

Charts

Weekly charts

Monthly charts

Year-end chart

Sales

Accolades

Release history

References

2022 albums
Taeyeon albums
SM Entertainment albums
Korean-language albums
Dance-pop albums by South Korean artists